John May built Mars at the naval dockyard at Amsterdam in 1769 as a fifth rate for the Dutch Navy. The British Royal Navy captured her on 3 February 1781 at Saint Eustatia. The Navy took her into service as HMS Mars, but sold her on 25 March 1784. Richard Bush purchased Mars, retained her name, and had her fitted as an East Indiaman. Adams repaired her and took her measurements in 1786. She sailed to China in April 1786 for the British East India Company (EIC) and was wrecked in December 1787 shortly after her return to Britain.

Capture

Following the outbreak of the Fourth Anglo-Dutch War between Britain and the Dutch Republic Admiral George Rodney, acting under orders from London, captured the Dutch island of St Eustatius on 3 February 1781.

Mars, under the command of Willem Krull, was the only Dutch warship in the roadstead. Because she was grossly outnumbered and outgunned, she fired only two or three pro-forma shots. Under the command of  Admiral Francis Reynolds, two of the British ships shot at Mars and Van Bijland then answered with his cannons. Rodney reprimanded the captains responsible for this lack of discipline.

Mars was captured with an entire convoy of merchant ships.

British Royal Navy
The Royal Navy commissioned Mars under Captain John Whitmore Chetwynd. He sailed her back to England as part of a fleet of prizes and other ships. She arrived at Portsmouth on 28 June 1781, and was paid off at Chatham in August. The Navy completed her survey there on 12 February 1782. It sold her on 25 March 1784 for £505.

East Indiaman
Richard Bush purchased her and had Mars refitted by Adams as an East Indiaman.

Under the command of Captain William Farington (or Farrington), she left The Downs on 26 April 1786, bound for China as an "extra" ship for the EIC. Mars arrived at Whampoa on 11 December. She crossed the Second Bar on 22 March 1787, and was at Mew Bay (some two miles east of Tanjung Layar), by 11 May. She arrived at Mauritius on 15 June, and left on 4 August. By 21 September she was at St Helena, which she left on 2 October. Mars arrived at The Downs on 8 December, but was lost on the Margate Sands the next day. The pilot made an error that resulted in her stranding. The cost to the EIC of the loss of her cargo was £70,000.

Notes

Citations

References

External links
 

1769 ships
Ships built in Amsterdam
Captured ships
Frigates of the Royal Navy
Ships of the British East India Company
Maritime incidents in 1787